Arachthos Festival is an annual three-day festival that takes place in early July in Ioannina, Epirus, on the banks of the Arachthos river.

External links
Municipality of Pamvotida

Festivals in Greece
Ioannina
Tourist attractions in Epirus (region)
Summer events in Greece